Vaceuchelus profundior, common name the deepwater top shell,  is a species of sea snail, a marine gastropod mollusk in the family Chilodontidae.

Description
The height of the shell attains 4.5mm, maximum diameter 4 mm.

(Original description) The shell is rather slender and elevated. Its colour is whitish to yellowish, with irregularly scattered dark brown spots on the keels. (Some co-types have few or no spots.) The shell contains four  rounded whorls. The spire is bicarinate, with two smaller keels on the shoulder. The body whorl has eight keels, the two at the periphery the strongest, the last, which is nodulous, encloses the umbilical area. The keels and interstices are crossed by numerous fine axial riblets, about 25 to 30 on a half turn of the body whorl. These riblets corrugate the keels, but do not form nodules. The outer lip is rather thin and expanded. The columella is smooth — not toothed — reflexed, so as to hide the small umbilicus from a front view.

Distribution
This marine species is endemic to Australaia and occurs off South Australia, Tasmania, Victoria and Western Australia.

References
 
 May, W.L. 1921. A Checklist of the Mollusca of Tasmania. Hobart, Tasmania : Government Printer 114 pp. 
 May, W.L. 1923. An illustrated index of Tasmanian shells: with 47 plates and 1052 species. Hobart : Government Printer 100 pp. 
 Cotton, B.C. 1945. Southern Australian Gastropoda. Part 1. Streptoneura. Transactions of the Royal Society of South Australia 69(1): 150-171
 Cotton, B. C. (1959). South Australian Mollusca. Archaeogastropoda. Handbook of the Flora and Fauna of South Australia Series. South Australian Branch of British Science Guild. W. L. Hawes, Government Printer, Adelaide. p. 1-448.
 Wilson, B. 1993. Australian Marine Shells. Prosobranch Gastropods. Kallaroo, Western Australia : Odyssey Publishing Vol. 1 408 pp.

External links
 To Encyclopedia of Life
 To World Register of Marine Species

profundior
Gastropods described in 1915
Gastropods of Australia